Gymnastics events at the 1987 Southeast Asian Games was held between 10 September to 12 September at Senayan Convention Center.

Medal summary

Men

Women's

Medal table

References
 http://eresources.nlb.gov.sg/newspapers/Digitised/Article/straitstimes19870911-1.2.56.38
 http://eresources.nlb.gov.sg/newspapers/Digitised/Article/straitstimes19870912-1.2.44.15.15
 http://eresources.nlb.gov.sg/newspapers/Digitised/Article/straitstimes19870913-1.2.43.4

1987 Southeast Asian Games
Southeast Asian Games
1987
Gymnastics competitions in Indonesia